Kwame Onwuachi is an Nigerian-American chef based in Los Angeles, CA. He was a contestant on Top Chef (season 13) in 2015. He has been recognized by Food & Wine magazine, Esquire magazine, and the James Beard Foundation as "Rising Star Chef of the year."

Early life 
Onwuachi was born on Long Island, New York, and grew up in The Bronx. At the age of 10, he was sent to live with his grandfather in Nigeria for two years.

Education and career
Onwuachi was expelled from several schools for behavioral issues and eventually graduated from Bronx Leadership Academy high school. He enrolled at the University of Bridgeport, from which he was expelled after several months for dealing and using illegal drugs. He then moved to live with his mother in Baton Rouge, Louisiana, where he was hired to cook on a boat serving crews cleaning up the Deepwater Horizon oil spill.

He returned to New York City in 2010, waiting tables at Tom Colicchio's Craft before opening his own catering business, Onwuachi's Coterie Catering. In 2012, Onwuachi enrolled at The Culinary Institute of America in Hyde Park, New York. During culinary school, Onwuachi worked an externship at Per Se, and after graduation he worked as a line cook at Eleven Madison Park. In 2015, he was a contestant on Top Chef (season 13).

In November 2016, Onwuachi opened his own restaurant in a converted townhouse in the Shaw neighborhood of Washington, D.C., called the Shaw Bijou, serving a 13-course tasting menu. The reviews were mixed, and critics questioned whether it was worth the price. After two months, Onwuachi scaled back the menu and reduced prices, but the primary investor closed the restaurant in January 2017.

In late 2017, Onwuachi was hired to open a restaurant in the new InterContinental Hotel on D.C.'s Southwest Waterfront. He named it "Kith and Kin", serving Afro-Caribbean cuisine influenced by his family ties to Louisiana, Jamaica, Trinidad, and Nigeria. The restaurant received positive reviews from The Washington Post and the Michelin Guide. In July 2020, Onwuachi resigned his position at Kith/Kin.

In 2019, Onwuachi published a memoir, Notes from a Young Black Chef, with Joshua David Stein. The book tells the story of his childhood in New York and Nigeria, and the opening of the Shaw Bijou. A followup cookbook, My America: Recipes from a Young Black Chef was published in May 2022.

Food & Wine magazine named Onwuachi one of its Best New Chefs in 2019. At the 2019 James Beard Awards, Onwuachi was named Rising Star Chef of the Year. Esquire named Onwuachi its Chef of the Year for 2019, identifying Kith/Kin as one of the Best New Restaurants in America.

In February 2021, Onwuachi joined Food & Wine magazine as Executive Producer.

External links
 Notes from a Young Black Chef (Penguin Random House/Knopf)
 My America: Recipes from a Young Black Chef (Penguin Random House/Knopf)

References 

Living people
1989 births
People from the Bronx
American chefs
Top Chef contestants
James Beard Foundation Award winners
American people of Nigerian descent
African-American chefs
21st-century African-American people
20th-century African-American people